Höngg is a quarter in district 10 in Zürich.

It was formerly a municipality of its own, having been incorporated into Zürich in 1934.

The quarter has a population of 21,186, distributed across an area of 6.98 km².

Höngg is renowned for its funfairs, such as the Wümmetfest and the Räbeliechtli Umzug.

The Protestant church Alte Kirche Höngg is the main church of Höngg.

Sport
SV Höngg is the quarter's football team.

Werdinsel 

Werdinsel, also known as Limmatauen Werdhölzli, is an island and protected area in the Limmat, to the west of the Europabrücke.

Gallery

External links

A drone flying north over the Reformed church, Meierhofplatz, and looking east down Am Wasser and the Limmat
More drone footage above Höngg

District 10 of Zürich
Former municipalities of the canton of Zürich
Limmat